In linguistics and in particular in natural language understanding, a dialog act is an utterance, in the context of a conversational dialog, that serves a function in the dialog. Types of dialog acts include a question, a statement, or a request for action. Dialog acts are a type of  speech act.

Dialog act recognition, also known as spoken utterance classification, is an important part of spoken language understanding. AI inference models or statistical models are used to recognize and classify dialog acts.

A dialog system typically includes a taxonomy of dialog types or tags that classify the different functions dialog acts can play.  One study had 42 types of dialog act in their taxonomy. Examples of types in this study include STATEMENT, OPINION, AGREEMENT/ACCEPT, and YES-NO-QUESTION.

The research on dialog acts have increased since 1999, after spoken dialog systems became commercial reality.

References

Discourse analysis
Oral communication
Philosophy of language
Pragmatics